The Gottlieb Londershausen House, at 402 Main Street, Dayton, Oregon, was built in c. 1907 and is listed on the U.S. National Register of Historic Places.  It is also known as the Culp Residence.  It is a 2-story  by  house.

The house is significant for its association with Gottlieb Londershausen, who immigrated in 1883 to the U.S. and came to Dayton in 1889 with his family.  Londershausen operated a shoe and harness repair shop for 29 years, located in two different buildings on Ferry Street between Second and Third Streets.

The house is one block away from the NRHP-listed Paul Londershausen House, located at 309 Main Street.  Both houses were listed on the NRHP with the same name, Londerhausen House, in 1987.  Paul Londershausen was one of Gottlieb's nine children.

See also
National Register of Historic Places listings in Yamhill County, Oregon

Notes

References

1907 establishments in Oregon
Buildings and structures in Dayton, Oregon
Houses completed in 1907
Houses in Yamhill County, Oregon
National Register of Historic Places in Yamhill County, Oregon